Mount McArthur is, at about , the highest peak  in the Walton Mountains of southern Alexander Island, Antarctica. It was named by the UK Antarctic Place-Names Committee after Malcolm McArthur, a British Antarctic Survey geophysicist at Stonington Island, 1971–73, who worked in northern Alexander Island.

See also
 List of Ultras of Antarctica
 Mount Athelstan
 Mount Schumann
 Mount Tyrrell

References

Mountains of Alexander Island